Robert Holden (born 1965) is a British psychologist, author, and broadcaster, who works in the field of positive psychology and well-being. He is the founder of The Happiness Project, which runs an eight-week course annually, called "Happiness Now", and the author of 10 best-selling books such as, Happiness NOW!, Be Happy, Success Intelligence and Shift Happens!. He runs the National Health Service (NHS) Stress Buster clinic, established first NHS "laughter clinic", and runs regular happiness workshops and seminars, with clients including employees of the NHS, the BBC and British Telecom.

Holden is a personal and professional coach, and the Director of The Happiness Project and Success Intelligence, through which he gives public lectures worldwide and holds public and corporate workshops and seminars for companies such as Dove, Virgin, The Body Shop and Unilever.

The Happiness Project, founded in England, featured in on two BBC TV documentaries:The Happiness Formula and How to be Happy (Q.E.D.). Holden does a weekly talk radio show on Hay House Radio, and appeared on The Oprah Winfrey Show in April 2007.

Biography
Robert Holden was born in Nairobi, Kenya. Robert Holden founded his NHS Stress Buster clinic, (laughter clinic) in 1989 in Birmingham, England. In 1994, he founded "The Happiness Project".  In 2000, he founded Success Intelligence Ltd. He, Robert, is the author of ten books, published in 14 languages, including Be Happy: Release The Power of Happiness in YOU, Happiness NOW!, Laughter The Best Medicine, Shift Happens!: Powerful Ways to Transform Your Life, Stress Busters, and Success Intelligence, and has also appeared on The Oprah Winfrey Show.

Bibliography
 Balancing Work and life, with Ben Renshaw. Dorling Kindersley Pub., 2002. .
 Happiness Now!: Timeless Wisdom for Feeling Good Fast], Hay House, Oct 2007. .
 Success Intelligence, Hay House, May 2009. .
 Shift Happens!: Powerful Ways to Transform Your Life, Jeffers Press, Oct 2006, .
 Be Happy: Release the power of happiness in YOU, Hay House, April 2009, .
 Happiness NOW! Perpetual Flip Calendar, Hay House, Nov 2008. .
 Success NOW! Perpetual Flip Calendar. Hay House, Nov 2010. .
 Shift Happens!: How to Live and Inspired Life Starting from NOW!, Hay House, Sep 2010. .
 Happiness NOW!: Timeless wisdom for feeling good fast, Hay House, Jan 2011. .
 Authentic Success: Essential Lessons and Practices from the World's Leading Coaching Program on Success Intelligence, Hay House, Inc, 2011. .

See also
 Happiness
 Forgiveness

References

Interview
 Book Excerpt: 'Be Happy: The Power of Happiness in You', Robert Holden at ABC News

External links
 Official Robert Holden Website
 Robert Holden – Official Contributor at Oprah.com
 Robert Holden on The Oprah Winfrey Show

British motivational writers
British self-help writers
1965 births
Living people
British psychologists
Positive psychologists
British motivational speakers
Life coaches
British talk radio presenters